StreetDance 3D (also called StreetDance) is a 2010 British 3D dance comedy-drama film which was released on 21 May 2010. The film was released in RealD 3D, XpanD 3D, and Dolby 3D with Max Giwa and Dania Pasquini directing it. Britain's Got Talent stars George Sampson, Diversity and Flawless made their debut appearances to the big screen. The soundtrack to the film was written and performed by alternative acts N-Dubz, Tinie Tempah, Lightbulb Thieves, and Chipmunk. The film is a production of Vertigo Films in association with BBC Films. N-Dubz composed the official soundtrack. The song "We Dance On", featuring Bodyrox, was sent to music stations on 22 April. On 28 May 2012, Phase 4 Films has acquired the US rights for the film, along with its sequel, StreetDance 2. Streetdance 2 was released on 30 March 2012.

Plot
In inner city London, a street dance crew is on the verge of breaking up after its leader, Jay (Ukweli Roach), leaves the group unexpectedly. The group loses the use of their rehearsal space. With a big street dance competition approaching the crew is forced to try and raise money or practice in other locations. Eventually they secure a space in a ballet school, on the condition that they include five ballet dancers in their routine for the competition. At first, they struggle to get along, but they all become friends in the end.

One of the teachers at the ballet school, Helena (Charlotte Rampling), takes the crew's new leader Carly (Nichola Burley) to a ballet where she starts getting ideas for their routine. When she arrives home, Carly finds Jay waiting for her and the two spend the night having sex. During a dance battle in a club the next night, the team learn that Jay has betrayed the team by joining The Surge, a rival crew. All for the sake of winning the competition. Jay brags about his sex with Carly and Tomas (Richard Winsor), a ballet dancer, punches Jay out of anger. Jay is furious and swears revenge. Carly, upset over the betrayal, leaves the club and is nearly hit by a car before Tomas pulls her out of the way. Tomas then takes Carly back to his apartment where they dance on the roof, eventually kissing. Carly then leaves him alone on the roof, while they both look at the sunrise and smile.

The next day at the school, Carly announces that they won't try to be better, they will be themselves by performing a routine that is both street and ballet. And that the new name of their dance crew is "Breaking Point". Another teacher at the school, outraged that her students are being corrupted, deliberately plans a Royal Ballet audition for the same day as the street dance finals. The ballet dancers promise Carly they will make it, but the auditions were running overtime.

In an attempt to give Breaking Point more time to wait for the ballet dancers to arrive, Carly's friend Eddie (George Sampson) goes out onto the dance floor and starts dancing, surprising the crew and wowing the audience. Jay tries to convince Carly to give up but she states that she is sorry for him. The ballet team turn up in time, and their teacher Helena drives the Royal Ballet judges to the streetdancing final so they can see the dancers perform. The routine is a success, Carly and Tomas kiss during the performance, and the crowd is enthralled. Jay is furious that The Surge have been beaten and he's lost Carly.

The film ends with Breaking Point and The Surge dancing to N-Dubz' "We Dance On".

Cast
 Nichola Burley as Carly
 Richard Winsor as Tomas
 Ukweli Roach as Jay
 Frank Harper as Fred
 George Sampson as Eddie
 Charlotte Rampling as Helena
 Eleanor Bron as Madame Fluerie
 Patrick Baladi as Mr Harding
Teneisha Bonner as Shawna
 Lex Milczarek as Boogie
 Kofi Agyemang-Prempeh as Mac
 Hugo Cortes as Gabe
 Sianad Gregory as Chloe
 Jennifer Leung as Bex
 Rachel McDowall as Isabella
 Rhimes Lecointe as Justine
 Sacha Chang as Aimee
 Bradley Charles as Frankie
 Lil Steph as Steph
 Brooke Milliner as Brooke
 Jeremy Sheffield as Michael
 Flawless as The Surge
 Ashley Banjo as Aaron
 Diversity as Aaron's Crew
 Jordan Long as Security Guard
 Jocelyn Jee Esien as Delilah (Shawna's boss)
 Tameka Empson as Sharonda (Shawna's colleague)
 Akai Osei-Mansfield as Dancing Kid in Shopping Mall
 Leigh Alderson as a Featured Dancer
 Babbal Kumar as dark dancer
Kyle Davey as a Featured Dancer
Brendan Conway as an Audience Dancer

Production
On 14 January 2009 it was announced that Max Giwa and Dania Pasquini would direct a 2010 British 3D dance drama movie similar to the Step Up movie series titled StreetDance 3D which would be released in cinemas in the UK, James Richardson would be the producer for the film with the budget of £3.5 million and Jane English would be the writer for the film, it was announced that Diversity, Flawless, George Sampson, Charlotte Rampling, Eleanor Bron, Nichola Burley, Patrick Baladi, Jocelyn Jee Esien, Richard Winsor and Jeremy Sheffield would star in the movie. Vertigo Films acquired distribution rights to the film. N-Dubz would compose the music for the movie. BBC Films and UK Film Council co-produced the film. StreetDance 3D filmed from August–December 2009. The film was shot with Paradise FX's Tri Delta camera systems. Max Penner (CTO of Paradise FX) was the stereographer. This film was also the launch of Paradise FX Europe. It was filmed on location, the shopping centre scene was filmed in Southside Shopping Centre and the streetdance competition was filmed in the Battersea Power Station. There is a scene featuring Akai Osei from Got to Dance which was filmed in September 2009. Charlie Bruce from So You Think You Can Dance also appears in the film, but her scenes were cut.

Reception
The film received positive reviews from film critics. The review aggregator Rotten Tomatoes gives the film a 76% "fresh" rating based on 25 reviews, with an average rating of 6/10. However the film was #1 for only one week in the U.K. after making £2,273,938 in box office. The film's box-office earnings after their theatrical run was $17,695,464. It was the highest grossing UK production released in 2010, beating Robin Hood and Prince of Persia: The Sands of Time.

Home media
The DVD and Blu-ray came out on 27 September in the UK which had 2 discs (one 2D and one 3D), also came with 3D glasses.

Soundtrack

 Tinie Tempah feat. Labrinth - Pass Out
 N-Dubz feat. Bodyrox - We Dance On
 Lightbulb Thieves - Work It Out
 Ironik - Tiny Dancer (Hold Me Closer)
 N-Dubz - Strong Again
 Pixie Lott - Live for the Moment
 Aggro Santos feat. Kimberly Wyatt - Candy
 Cheryl Cole - Fight for This Love
 Lethal Bizzle - Going Out Tonight
 Sugababes - Get Sexy
 LP & JC - The Humblest Start
 Wiley - Cash In My Pocket
 Madcon - Beggin'
 LP & JC feat. Skibadee, Mc Det, and Chrome & Blemish - Club Battle
 Fatboy Slim - Champion Sound
 Vega4 - Life Is Beautiful
 McLean - Broken
 Swiss feat. Music Kidz - One in a Million
 Wiley - Wearing My Rolex
 Clement Marfo & The Frontline – Champion
iTunes Bonus
 Craig David - One More Lie (Standing in the Shadows) [Donae'o Mix]
 N-Dubz - I Don't Wanna Go to Sleep
 LP & JC - Let's Dance
 Movie Clip 1
 Movie Clip 2

Sequel
Streetdance 2 was released in UK cinema screens, in 3D and 2D, on 30 March 2012. Early casting calls revealed the sequel to have a "Latin twist".

Remake
A French remake entitled Let's Dance was released in 2019. The remake flips the genders of the original film's characters, having male lead Rayane Bensetti in the 'Carly' role (renamed Joseph) and female lead Alexia Giordano in the 'Tomas' role (renamed Chloé), among other changes. Guillaume de Tonquédec, Brahim Zaibat, Florence Pernel and Line Renaud appear in supporting roles.

References

External links
 
 BBC Film Network: StreetDance 3D set report
 
 
 

2010 films
2010 3D films
2010 comedy-drama films
British 3D films
British comedy-drama films
2010s English-language films
IMAX films
Vertigo Films films
Universal Pictures films
British dance films
2010s dance films
Films about dance competitions
Films directed by Max Giwa
Films directed by Dania Pasquini
2010s British films